Westville is a residential area to the west of Hucknall.  It is approximately eight miles north-west of Nottingham, England.

It has many new build houses on the former Rolls-Royce site and a Sainsbury's Local, a Co-op store and local takeaways. The local Anglican church is the mid-twentieth century Church of St Peter and St Paul.

Hamlets in Nottinghamshire
Ashfield District